On 30 September 1983, a bomb detonated during an international fair at the Palais des Congrès (exhibition centre) in Marseille, France. One person was killed and 25 other people were injured in the attack, which happened near the American and Algerian stands.

Many groups claimed responsibility, including the Charles Martel Group, the Armenian Secret Army for the Liberation of Armenia, the Lebanese Armed Revolutionary Factions and Commando Delta. The real culprits were never identified.

See also
1983 Orly Airport attack
Algerian consulate bombing in Marseille

References

1983 murders in France
Exhibition bombing
Attacks on buildings and structures in Marseille
Improvised explosive device bombings in 1983
Improvised explosive device bombings in France
Exhibition bombing
September 1983 crimes
September 1983 events in Europe
Terrorist incidents by unknown perpetrators
Terrorist incidents in France in 1983
Exhibition bombing 
Unsolved murders in France
Building bombings in France